Brothers Islands Lighthouse is an active 19th century lighthouse located on The Brothers, Egypt, an island in the Red Sea, 65 km east of al-Qusayr. Built by the British in 1883 and renovated in 1993, the lighthouse is operated by the Egyptian Navy. The site is usually open to visitors who are normally permitted to climb the  tower.

The lighthouse still retains its original hand-cranked Chance Brothers Fresnel lens and drive mechanism, which requires winding every four hours by the attendant lighthouse keepers.

References

Lighthouses in Egypt
Lighthouses of the Red Sea
Lighthouses completed in 1883
1883 establishments in Egypt